Andrei Gasparovich Berzin (January 23, 1893, Majorenhof, Governorate of Livonia — 1951, Latvian SSR) was a Soviet politician.

After the Russian Civil War Berzin remained in Soviet Russia, where he worked as deputy head of the administrative and financial department of the People's Commissariat of Agriculture.

In 1930, along with other economists Nikolai Kondratiev, Alexander Chayanov and  he was arrested by Cheka in the case of the so-called . In 1931, Berzin was exiled to Kazakhstan, where he worked as an economist-planner at Soyuzpromkorm.

In 1938, during the Latvian Operation of the NKVD Berzin was arrested again and imprisoned in a Gulag correctional labour camp until the end of World War II, after which he was released and allowed to return to Moscow.

First husband of actress Lyubov Orlova (1926—1930). After the arrest, the actress did not know anything about his fate. According to the biographers, while already being a wife of Grigory Alexandrov, she had asked Stalin to find out about Berzin and help him.

Berzin died in 1951 from cancer in Latvia, where he was living with his relatives.

References 

Gulag detainees
Deaths from cancer in Latvia
1951 deaths
1893 births
Russian people of Latvian descent